Mayukh Mahar is an Indian politician who is the current representative from the Pithoragarh legislative constituency in Uttarakhand State Legislative assembly. He is a member of Indian National Congress.  Currently, he is the MLA representing Pithoragarh State Legislative Constituency. Ethnically, he is a Kumaoni and a Kshatriya Rajput. He was elected as MLA from Pithoragarh constituency for the first time in 2012. Then, in 2017 assembly elections, he got defeated by Prakash Pant. Afterwards, in 2022 Uttarakhand Legislative Assembly Elections, he again came to power, defeating Chandra Pant from Bharatiya Janata Party.

References

Uttarakhand MLAs 2012–2017
Uttarakhand MLAs 2022–2027
Indian National Congress politicians from Uttarakhand
Kumaoni Rajputs
People from Pithoragarh district
Year of birth missing (living people)
Living people